Dilepididae is a family of flatworms belonging to the order Cyclophyllidea.

Genera
The World Register of Marine Species accepts the following genera within Dilepididae:

 Alcataenia Spasskaya, 1971
 Amoebotaenia Cohn, 1899
 Anomotaenia Cohn, 1900
 Capsulata Sandeman, 1959
 Choanotaenia Railliet, 1896
 Dictymetra Clark, 1952
 Dilepis Weinland, 1858
 Icterotaenia Railliet & Henry, 1909
 Laritaenia Spasskaya & Spasskii, 1971
 Lateriporus Fuhrmann, 1907
 Malika Woodland, 1929
 Nototaenia Jones & Williams, 1967
 Paraliga Belopolskaja & Kulachkova, 1973
 Paricterotaenia Fuhrmann, 1932
 Parorchites Fuhrmann, 1932
 Platyscolex Spasskaya, 1962
 Pseudanomotaenia Matevosyan, 1963
 Reticulotaenia Hoberg, 1985

References

Cestoda
Platyhelminthes families